Military intelligence is a military discipline that uses information collection and analysis approaches to provide guidance and direction to commanders in support of their decisions. 

Military Intelligence may also refer to:
Military Intelligence (Czech Republic),  military intelligence service of the Czech Republic 
Military Intelligence (Pakistan),  intelligence arm of the Pakistan Army
Military Intelligence Directorate (Israel)
Military Intelligence Directorate (Syria)
Military Intelligence Service (United States)
Directorate of Military Intelligence (disambiguation)

See also
Defense intelligence (disambiguation)
National Intelligence Service (disambiguation)
Federal Intelligence Service (disambiguation)
Foreign Intelligence service (disambiguation)
State Intelligence Service (disambiguation)
General Intelligence Directorate (disambiguation)
Directorate of Military Intelligence (disambiguation)
Intelligence Bureau (disambiguation)